Joanne Firesteel Reid (born 28 June 1992 in Madison, Wisconsin) is an American biathlete. She competed at the 2018 Winter Olympics, and 2022 Winter Olympics, in Women's mass start, Women's relay, Women's pursuit, Women's individual, and Women's sprint.

Life 
Joanne Reid is the daughter of Olympian Beth Heiden and niece of Eric Heiden. She grew up in Palo Alto
and skied cross country at University of Colorado.

She competed in the Biathlon World Championships 2017, and Biathlon World Championships 2021.

Biathlon results
All results are sourced from the International Biathlon Union.

Olympic Games
0 medals

World Championships
0 medals

*During Olympic seasons competitions are only held for those events not included in the Olympic program.

World Cup

References

External links 
 
 Website of the official fan club of Joanne Reid : OFFICIAL FAN CLUB - CLICK HERE

1992 births
Living people
Sportspeople from Madison, Wisconsin
American female biathletes
Olympic biathletes of the United States
Biathletes at the 2018 Winter Olympics
Biathletes at the 2022 Winter Olympics
21st-century American women